The Sofia Boys Choir is the first  boys' choir in Bulgaria, founded in 1968. Artists from 8 to 15 years old are selected from schools in Sofia. Adriana Blagoeva has been a conductor of the choir since 1989. In the year 1997 she founded the Youth Formation with the Sofia Boys Choir, consisting of former members of the boys' choir. Today the choir is presented in three formations – boys, youth, and mixed.

The Sofia Boys Choir has very wide repertoire: Bulgarian choral music, Orthodox music, Bulgarian folk music, choral pieces of various musical genres from the 14th century to today and participations in musicals and operas. There are many recordings of the Sofia boys' choir in the musical archives of Bulgarian National Radio (BNR) and Bulgarian National Television (BNT). The choir has issued 11 solo audio CDs and has participated in another 9 with other musicians.the sofia boys choir

Was the best
      
Since 1993, the Sofia Boys Choir has won many awards at international choral competitions, and have toured throughout Europe and Japan.

References

External links 
 

Bulgarian choirs
Boys' and men's choirs
Youth choirs
Choirs of children
Musical groups established in 1968
Culture in Sofia